Invisible-Exports is a contemporary art gallery located in the Lower East Side of Manhattan, New York. It is co-owned and directed by Risa Needleman and Benjamin Tischer and recognized for housing provocative and controversial exhibitions. The gallery represents a small roster of influential avant-garde artists, including iconic artist Genesis P-Orridge. The gallery is part of a network of galleries in the LES, referred to as a "gallery district."

The gallery participates in "Third Thursdays", an initiative instituted by the LES Business Improvement District that seeks to elevate interest in the area by encouraging galleries to stay open until 9pm on the third Thursday of every month.

Represented artists 
 Genesis P-Orridge
 Walt Cassidy
 Scott Treleaven

Projects and additional works 

 Aaron Krach

Solo exhibitions 
 2008 You People, Mickey Smith
 2009 Closer Than That, Paul Gabrielli
 2009 House of Cards, Lisa Kirk
 2009 The Only Way Out is Through, Michael Bilsborough
 2009 Rape New York, Jana Leo
 2009 30 Years of Being Cut Up, Genesis P-Orridge
 2009 Sometimes When We Touch, Stephen Irwin
 2009 NADA Art Fair, Paul Gabrielli
 2010 Les Tristes, Lucas Ajemian and Julien Bismuth
 2010 Volta NY, Mickey Smith
 2010 The Protective Motif, Walt Cassidy
 2010 Revolution! (SmartSpaces), Lisa Kirk
 2010 Watermill Center, Breyer P-Orridge
 2010 Believe You Me, Mickey Smith
 2010 EAB Fair, Lucas Ajemian and Julien Bismuth
 2010 NADA Art Fair, Breyer P-Orridge
 2011 Moving Image, Breyer P-Orridge
 2011 Generally, Paul Gabrielli
 2011 The Undefeated, Matthew Porter

References

External links 
 Invisible-Exports, 89 Eldridge Street

Art museums and galleries in Manhattan